Quintus Curtius Rufus was a Roman historian, probably of the 1st century, author of his only known and only surviving work, Historiae Alexandri Magni, "Histories of Alexander the Great", or more fully Historiarum Alexandri Magni Macedonis Libri Qui Supersunt, "All the Books That Survive of the Histories of Alexander the Great of Macedon." Much of it is missing. Apart from his name on the manuscripts, nothing else certain is known of him. This fact alone has led philologists to believe that he had another historical identity, to which, due to the accidents of time, the link has been broken. A few theories exist. They are treated with varying degrees of credibility by various authors. Meanwhile, the identity of Quintus Curtius Rufus, historian, is maintained separately.

The historical alter ego
Curtius' work is uniquely isolated. No other ancient work refers to it, or as far as is known, to him. Peter Pratt pointing out that the Senate and emperors frequently proscribed or censored works, suggests that Curtius had not published the manuscript before his death, but left it in care of the emperor. The emperors intended to publish it posthumously but did not find a political opportunity. They had adopted the identity of Alexander for themselves. The provinces fashioned from the Macedonian Empire were difficult to govern, always on the point of rebellion. The work of Curtius, Pratt conjectures, was not politically appropriate because it would have encouraged independence.

The earliest opportune moment was the year 167, when the campaign of the emperor Marcus Aurelius against the Parthian Empire had failed, and the returning troops were in bad morale and infected with the Antonine Plague. The emperor attempted to build national pride among the former Macedonian states. Avidius Cassius, commandant of Legio III Gallica, returning veterans, was promoted to Consul. He claimed descent from the Seleucids of Macedonia. New coins and medals were issued in Macedonia on Alexandrian themes. Pratt conjectures that the manuscript in storage, by this time damaged and partly destroyed, was published finally, accounting for the previous lack of references to it. It is also possible Books I and II along with other loci were censored out. As the emperors probably had surmised, it was immediately popular.

Most credible date

The dating available relies entirely on internal evidence, which is not certain but offers some degree of preponderance. In Book X Curtius digresses to give an encomium on blessings of peace under the empire, citing the Roman Empire with the implication of contemporaneity. In essence he reasserts the policy of Augustus, which casts the empire as the restoration of monarchy for the suppression of the civil wars fomented by the contention of powerful noblemen vying for control of the Republic. Curtius' glowing endorsement of the policy dates him to the Roman Empire.

He also mentions the Parthian Empire. It was formed by the eastern satrapies recusing themselves from Macedonian overlordship and restoring a purely Iranian empire. It defended itself successfully against Rome, even though Rome absorbed what was left of the Macedonian kingdoms. The dates of the Parthian Empire are 247 BC through 224 AD. Although Curtius may have been writing about an empire that vanished in his own day, the most straightforward approach assumes that he wrote in a window, 63 BC (start of the Roman Empire) through 224 AD.

For further localization, the same imperial purple passage contrasts the civil wars of the Macedonians (Diadochi wars) due to failure to obtain a stable emperor, with an incident of the Roman Empire in which the risk of the civil war was avoided by the appointment of a new emperor in a single night. Not very many incidents fit the description. Baynham summarizes the argument of Julius Nützell that the crisis might be the night of January 24/25, 41 AD, following the assassination of Caligula on that day. The Senate met on an emergency basis to debate whether the Roman Republic should be restored. The Praetorian Guard forced its way in to insist on the appointment of Caligula's uncle, Claudius. His reign concentrated on the restoration of the rule of law. A lawyer, he issued up to 20 imperial edicts per day, re-establishing the Pax Romana. If this argument is correct, Curtius' work must be dated to after 41 AD.

The upper limit is provided by a passage that mentions the "continued prosperity of Tyre under Roman dominion." The peace of the empire came to an end in 43 AD when Claudius invaded Britain. None of these dates are certain, but the union of all the ranges presents a credible view of Curtius' date. Baynham says: "many modern scholars now accept a date in the middle to late part of the first century A.D. as a likely floruit for Curtius."

Most credible identity
By his name, Quintus Curtius Rufus was a member of the Curtii Rufi branch of the Curtii family, one of the original nobility of Rome. Due to the frequently used institution of adoption, people of the name Curtius (or female Curtia) might not be consanguineous. Moreover, the same name tended to be repeated, typically from grandfather to grandson. After centuries of Curtii, a Curtius might turn up in history at any location or in any period.

The candidates for the historical identity of the author are but few. Given the time frame of the mid-1st century, however, there is a credible candidate. He is a certain Curtius Rufus (The praenomen has been omitted. Presumably it is Quintus.) In the List of Roman consuls he served as Consul Suffectus for October through December, 43 AD under the emperor Claudius. He had been a protégé of Tiberius.

He must have written the Histories in a year or two before the consulship. Tacitus says that he was on the staff of the Quaestor of Africa during that time, which would have given him the opportunity to use the Library of Alexandria. Tiberius had died in 37; Caligula was emperor then. Curtius' relations with Caligula are not mentioned. But Caligula was not in his vicinity.

On Curtius' return, a book such as the Historiae unless politically incorrect would have impressed the scholarly Claudius. Tiberius already had been an admirer before the book: he said that Curtius Rufus was his own ancestor; i.e., a self-made man. Tacitus hints that Curtius was of low birth, possibly the son of a gladiator. The story is only compatible with the name if one assumes adoption, which Tiberius could easily have arranged,

If Curtius took office at the minimum age of 25, and Tiberius made his comment in the year of his own death, Curtius would have been 19 or younger when described as a self-made man. In an age when Alexander had become regent of Macedon at 16, a rise to fame at 19, and consulship at 25, would not have been incredible. Tiberius would have been a senior emperor when Curtius came to his attention. What his qualifications were for the patronage remain obscure. If, on the other hand, Quintus Curtius Rufus is to be identified with Curtius Rufus, Consul Suffect of 43, then the most likely circumstantial evidence places his birth in the early years of the 1st century, in the reign of Augustus.

The Historiae

Manuscripts and editions
Historiae survives in 123 codices, or bound manuscripts, all deriving from an original in the 9th century. As it was a partial text, already missing large pieces, they are partial as well. They vary in condition. Some are more partial than others, with lacunae that developed since the 9th century. The original contained ten libri, "books," equivalent to our chapters. Book I and II are missing, along with any Introduction that might have been expected according to ancient custom. There are gaps in V, VI, and X. Many loci, or "places," throughout are obscure, subject to interpretation or emendation in the name of restoration.

The work enjoyed popularity in the High Middle Ages. It is the main source for a genre of tales termed the Alexander Romance (some say romances); for example, Walter of Chatillon's epic poem Alexandreis, which was written in the style of Virgil's Aeneid. These romances spilled over into the Renaissance, especially of Italy, where Curtius was idolized. Painters, such as Paolo Veronese and Charles Le Brun, painted scenes from Curtius.

The Editio Princeps, or first printed edition, was published in 1470 or 1471 at Venice by Vindelinus Spirensis. A slow but steady stream of editions appeared subsequently until more of a need for standardization was perceived. In 1867 Edmund Hedicke instigated a convention that persists yet. He based his edition of that year on the five best manuscripts.

The vulgate authors
In what remains of his work, Curtius mainly does not identify sources. They were, perhaps, stated in the missing books. Speculations of what they were based on thorough analysis of the content and style vary widely. Yardley and Heckel say: "The internal evidence for Curtius' sources is disappointing." He does, however, mention Cleitarchus, a historian in camp, twice, Ptolemy once, and Timagenes once. These men were participants in the Alexander story and therefore are counted as eyewitnesses, or primary sources. All accounts based on them are by analogy also termed "primary." These works are also called "the Vulgate."

See also
 Curtius Rufus

Notes

Citations

Sources

Further reading

 Huyse, Philip (1993, updated 2011). "Curtius Rufus, Quintus". Encyclopaedia Iranica, VI/5, pp. 464–465.

External links

 Latin text of Curtius on LacusCurtius website.
 Latin text of Curtius. A slightly different version on the ForumRomanum website.
 

1st-century historians
1st-century Romans
Rufus, Quintus
Historiography of Alexander the Great
Latin historians

Year of birth unknown
Year of death unknown